White Rock is an unincorporated community in White Rock Township, Ogle County, Illinois, United States, located  south-southwest of Davis Junction.

References

Unincorporated communities in Ogle County, Illinois
Unincorporated communities in Illinois